Clandestine may refer to:

 Secrecy, the practice of hiding information from certain individuals or groups, perhaps while sharing it with other individuals
 Clandestine operation, a secret intelligence or military activity

Music and entertainment
 Clandestine (album), a 1991 album by Entombed
 Clandestine (band), a Celtic music band from Texas, U.S.
 Clandestine, a short film included with the special limited edition of the album Sing the Sorrow by AFI
 ClanDestine, a comic book series by Alan Davis published by Marvel Comics
 Clandestine (novel), a 1983 novel by James Ellroy

Other uses
 Clandestine Industries (Fashion), a merchandise line by Pete Wentz of Fall Out Boy
 La Clandestine Absinthe, a Swiss absinthe brand
 Clandestine is a name for the parasitic plant Lathraea clandestina
 Clandestine trading, is trade with countries prohibited by law
 Clandestine cell system, a method of organizing people

See also
 Clandestine worker, a term for some illegal immigrants
 Clandestinity (canon law), an impediment to marriage in the canon law of the Roman Catholic Church
 Clandestino, an album by Manu Chao
 Clandestino is also the name of the evil antagonist of the children's series The Bluffers
 Clandestiny, a 1996 video-based puzzle computer game
 National Clandestine Service, the main U.S. intelligence agency for coordinating human intelligence services
 
 Conspiracy